Georg Wilhelm Steinkopf (28 June 1879 – 12 March 1949) was a German chemist. Today he is mostly remembered for his work on the production of mustard gas during World War I.

Life
Georg Wilhelm Steinkopf was born on 28 June 1879 in Staßfurt, in the Prussian Province of Saxony in the German Empire, the son of Gustav Friedrich Steinkopf, a merchant, and his wife Elise Steinkopf (née Heine).

In 1898 he began studying chemistry and physics at the University of Heidelberg. In 1899 he moved to the Technische Hochschule Karlsruhe (today the Karlsruhe Institute of Technology), where he finished his studies with a degree as Diplomingenieur in 1905. In Karlsruhe, he also met his future colleagues Fritz Haber and Roland Scholl. After receiving his Doctor of Science and eventually his Habilitation in 1909, he worked as an associate professor at the TU Karlsruhe until 1914, when he volunteered for service in World War I.

In 1916 Fritz Haber, who was now the director of the Kaiser Wilhelm Institute for Physical Chemistry and Electrochemistry (KWIPC, today the Fritz Haber Institute of the Max Planck Society) in Berlin, invited Steinkopf to join his institute as the head of a team devoted to research on chemical weapons. Together with chemical engineer Wilhelm Lommel, Steinkopf developed a method for the large-scale production of bis(2-chloroethyl) sulfide, commonly known as mustard gas. Mustard gas was subsequently assigned the acronym LOST (LOmmel/STeinkopf) by the German military.

Steinkopf's work on mustard gas and related substances had a negative impact on his health, which caused him to switch to another department of the KWIPC in 1917, supervising the production of gas ammunition.

Although Fritz Haber wanted him to stay in Berlin, Steinkopf moved to Dresden after the end of World War I. Succeeding  as the associate professor in organic chemistry at the Technische Universität Dresden, he worked there from 1919 until his retirement. His research focussed on organic arsenic compounds, thiophene compounds, and the formation of petroleum.

In 1924, Steinkopf became a member of the Beirat des Heereswaffenamts (Heereswaffenamt advisory council), an agency of the German military responsible for weapons research and development. He worked under strict secrecy and most of his friends and colleagues in Dresden did not know about this activity.

After the Machtergreifung of the National Socialists in 1933, Reichswehrminister Werner von Blomberg demanded the Saxonian Volksbildungsministerium (Ministry of the People's Education) to show more recognition for Steinkopf's work during World War I. In 1935, Steinkopf was promoted to full professor, and continued to work at the TU Dresden until his retirement in 1940.

His health being fragile due to his work with mustard gas and related substances, Steinkopf died on 12 March 1949 in Stuttgart.

Aside from his scientific research, Steinkopf wrote several poems, novellas, and novels.

Notable works

Scientific
  Steinkopf was a co-author of this book.

Fiction

Non-fiction

References

1879 births
1949 deaths
People from Staßfurt
People from the Province of Saxony
20th-century German engineers
Chemical warfare
Academic staff of TU Dresden
German chemical engineers
Karlsruhe Institute of Technology alumni
Engineers from Saxony-Anhalt